Sakvarbai (née Gaikwad) was the fourth wife of Shivaji I, the founder of the Maratha Empire. She was a daughter of a Maratha aristocrat, Nandaji Rao Gaikwad.

Sakvarbai Gaikwad married Shivaji I in January 1656, at the time she was his fourth wife. She later gave birth to a daughter named, Kamalabai. Kamalabai later married Janoji Palkar, who belonged from an aristocratic family.

After the death of her husband in 1680, she wanted to commit sati just like her husband's third wife, Putalabai. But was not allowed to do so because she had a daughter.

Death
Sakvarbai died in the captivity of Aurangzeb, after being taken as a prisoner along with other imperial family members during the escape from Raigad fort when it was captured following the death of Sambhaji I.

References

Indian female royalty
Women of the Maratha Empire
17th-century Indian women
17th-century Indian people